My Siblings and I is a 2018 Nigerian comedy series, produced by Funke Akindele and co-directed by JJC Skillz and Olasunkanmi Adebayo, the Series is based on the life of the Aberuagba family depicted as an extended family made up of the parents, Solomon who is a retired army brigadier general and his wife Rosemary who is a teacher in the series. It is now in its 4th season from the first season which was premiered on the 6th of August 2018 and still ongoing.

Premise 
The series shows the ridiculous, absurd and funny behaviours displayed by each member of the family including the friends of the family members and the domestic workers, not excluding the heated arguments and periodic misunderstanding which goes on in the Aberuagba family,  but no matter the crisis in the Aberuagba family, they always stand by each other in genuine love.

Cast 
 Funke Akindele as Vivian Aberuagba
 Chinelo Ejianwu as Lily Aberuagba
 Babaseun Faseru as Stanley Aberuagba
 Soma Anyama as Dave Aberuagba
 Jessica Orishane as Nnena Aberuagba
 Tomiwa Tegbe as James Aberuagba
 Patrick Doyle as Solomon Aberuagba  
 Vivian Metchie as Mrs Aberuagba

Awards and nominations 
 In the year 2019, the series was nominated for the City People Entertainment Awards.

References 

Nigerian sequel films
2018 Nigerian television seasons
2018 films
2021 comedy films
English-language Nigerian films
Nigerian comedy films